Pir Mowmen Sara (also Romanized as Pīr Mow’men Sarā) is a village in Jirdeh Rural District, in the Central District of Shaft County, Gilan Province, Iran. At the 2006 census, its population was 334, in 99 families.

References 

Populated places in Shaft County